Heliophanillus metallifer is a jumping spider species in the genus Heliophanillus that lives in the United Arab Emirates. The male was first described in 2010.

References

Salticidae
Spiders of the Arabian Peninsula
Spiders described in 2010